The Miller Cabin complex consists of three buildings that were the residence of Robert A. Miller, the first superintendent of Teton National Monument. A house, a barn and a cabin built by the U.S. Forest Service are included. The property was eventually transferred to the U.S. Fish and Wildlife Service in what became the National Elk Refuge. The buildings are a component of the closely related Grace and Robert Miller Ranch.

Robert Miller was born at Wisconsin  in 1863. He took up permanent residence in Jackson Hole in 1885, settling on land along Flat Creek. A prominent local citizen, Miller helped to organize the town of Jackson, Wyoming in 1901 and was president of the local bank. His wife served two terms as mayor of Jackson in the 1920s. Miller was chosen by Abraham Archibald Anderson, administrator of the new Yellowstone Timberland Reserve to be administrator of the Teton Division of the reserve from 1903, running the operation from his cabin.

The original cabin was Miller's home during his time with the Forest Service. The adjoining two-story house was used as the headquarters for the National Elk Refuge in its early years.

References

External links
Miller Cabin at the Wyoming State Historic Preservation Office

Houses on the National Register of Historic Places in Wyoming
Houses in Teton County, Wyoming
Ranches in Wyoming
National Register of Historic Places in Grand Teton National Park
1890s establishments in Wyoming
Houses completed in the 19th century